The 1922 West Down by-election was held on 17 February 1922.  The by-election was held due to the appointment as Chief Clerk to the High Court of Northern Ireland of the incumbent Ulster Unionist MP, Thomas Browne Wallace.  It was won by the UUP candidate Hugh Hayes.

References

1922 elections in the United Kingdom
By-elections to the Parliament of the United Kingdom in County Down constituencies
Unopposed by-elections to the Parliament of the United Kingdom (need citation)
20th century in County Down
1922 elections in Northern Ireland